The Transcaspian electoral district was a constituency created for the 1917 Russian Constituent Assembly election. The electoral district covered the Transcaspian Oblast, except for most of the Mangyshlak uezd (only the volosts inhabited by Turkmens remained part of the Transcaspian electoral district). The Transcaspian electoral district was assigned 2 seats in the Constituent Assembly. According to U.S. historian Oliver Henry Radkey (1989), an election was held but results not known. Per Wade (2004), it is certain that no election took place in the Transcaspian electoral district.

References

Electoral districts of the Russian Constituent Assembly election, 1917